Julia Spencer-Fleming (born June 26, 1961) is an American novelist of Mystery fiction. She has won the Agatha Award, Anthony Award, Macavity Awards, Dilys Award, Barry Award (for crime novels), the Nero Award, and Gumshoe Awards. She has also been a finalist for the Edgar Award. Her books feature Clare Fergusson, a retired helicopter pilot turned Episcopal priest and Russ Van Alstyne, a police chief. They are set in Millers Kill, a fictional town in upstate New York.

Spencer-Fleming was born in Plattsburgh, New York and has degrees from Ithaca College, George Washington University and the University of Maine School of Law. Spencer-Fleming lives in Buxton, Maine

Bibliography

Rev. Clare Fergusson/Russ Van Alstyne series 

In the Bleak Midwinter (2002, hardcover , paperback 978-0-312-98676-6)
A Fountain Filled With Blood (2003, hardcover , paperback 978-0-312-99543-0)
Out of the Deep I Cry (2004, hardcover , paperback )
To Darkness and To Death (2005, hardcover , paperback )
All Mortal Flesh (2006, hardcover , paperback 978-0-312-93398-2)
I Shall Not Want (2008, hardcover )
One Was A Soldier  (2011, hardcover )
Through the Evil Days  (2013, hardcover , paperbacks 978-1-472-20002-0 and 978-1-472-20000-6, audio 978-1-427-23104-8)
Hid from Our Eyes (2020, hardcover )

Awards
 2002 Agatha Award for In the Bleak Midwinter
 2003 Anthony Award for In the Bleak Midwinter
 2003 Macavity Award for In the Bleak Midwinter
 2003 Dilys Award for In the Bleak Midwinter
 2003 Barry Award for In the Bleak Midwinter
 2007 Nero Wolfe Award for All Mortal Flesh
 2007 Gumshoe Award for All Mortal Flesh

References

External links
Official Website 
Bookpage Interview, April 15, 2020
Publishers Weekly Forecast Interview
Maine Bar Journal Interview

21st-century American novelists
American women novelists
Living people
Nero Award winners
Anthony Award winners
Macavity Award winners
Agatha Award winners
Barry Award winners
Dilys Award winners
Ithaca College alumni
George Washington University alumni
University of Maine School of Law alumni
1961 births
People from Buxton, Maine
People from Plattsburgh, New York
Women mystery writers
21st-century American women writers